Luarca (Ḷḷuarca in Asturian and officially) is a parish and the principal town in the municipality of Valdés in Asturias, Spain.

Luarca (town) is a fishing and pleasure port. The Nobel laureate for Medicine in 1959, Severo Ochoa, was born in Luarca. It is well known for its beautiful architecture, landscapes, gastronomy, and tourist attractions. San Timoteo festivities usually attract thousands of people every August.

Museo del Calamar Gigante, said to be the world's only museum dedicated to the giant squid, was based in the town from its opening in 2010 to its destruction by a storm in 2014; it reopened at a new location in the centre of town in 2022.

Way of St. James 

The Way of St. James named The Northern Way (Camino de la Costa) passes Luarca.

Economy 

Fishery and agriculture have dominated the region for hundreds of years. Luarca is home to the ALSA bus company.

Climate 

The town experiences warm summers and relatively mild winters, but strong storms occur in autumn.

Points of interest 

 The Fishery Harbour
 Palace of the Marquis of Ferrera
 Lighthouse of Luarca
 Giant Squid Museum

Notable people 

 Severo Ochoa (1905–1993), physician and biochemist, Nobel prizewinner

Villages in Luarca (parish) 

 Luarca (town): population 3,620 (2021)
 Almuña: 870 (2021)  
 Fontoria: 92 (2021)  
 Barceļļina: 87 (2021)  
 Portizuelo: 1 (2021)

References

External links 

 City page
  Asturian Map]
Luarca. The White Town of the Green Coast

Parishes in Valdés
Towns in Asturias